The 14th Infantry Brigade was a British Army formation during both the First World War and the Second World War.

History

First World War 
In 1914 this brigade was part of the 5th Division and moved over to France. On 30 December 1915 the brigade was transferred to the 32nd Division.

Order of battle
Subordinate units included:
1st Battalion, Devonshire Regiment - (left January 1916 transferred to 95th Brigade)
2nd Battalion, Suffolk Regiment - (left September 1914)
1st Battalion, East Surrey Regiment - (left January 1916 transferred to 95th Brigade)
1st Battalion, Duke of Cornwall's Light Infantry - (left January 1916 transferred to 95th Brigade)
2nd Battalion, Manchester Regiment - (joined December 1915, left February 1918 transferred to 96th Brigade)
 1st Battalion, Dorset Regiment (joined 7 January 1916)
1/5th Battalion, Cheshire Regiment - (joined February 1915, left November 1915)
1/9th (Highlanders) Battalion, Royal Scots - (joined November 1915)
2nd Battalion, Royal Inniskilling Fusiliers - (joined November 1915)
5th/6th Battalion, Royal Scots – (joined July 1916)
15th (Service) Battalion (2nd Birmingham) Birmingham Pals - (joined December 1915 transferred from 95th Brigade, left January 1916 transferred to 13th Brigade)
19th (Service) Battalion (3rd Salford), Lancashire Fusiliers (joined January 1916 transferred from 96th Brigade, left July 1916)
15th (Service) Battalion (1st Glasgow), Highland Light Infantry (joined January 1916 transferred from 97th Brigade)
4th Machine Gun Company (joined February 1916, moved to 32nd Battalion Machine Gun Corps (M.G.C.) 21 February 1918)
14th Trench Mortar Battery (joined March 1916)

Commanders
The following commanded the 14th Infantry Brigade during the First World War:
Brigadier-General S. P. Rolt (at mobilization)
Lieutenant-Colonel J. R. Longley (20 October 1914 - acting)
Brigadier-General F. S. Maude (23 October 1914)
Lieutenant-Colonel E. G. Williams (12 April 1915 - acting)
Brigadier-General G. H. Thesiger (17 April 1915 - temporary)
Brigadier-General F. S. Maude (4 May 1915)
Brigadier-General C. W. Crompton (10 September 1915)
Brigadier-General C. R. Ballard (26 December 1915)
Lieutenant-Colonel M. Archer-Shee (20 July 1916 - acting)
Brigadier-General Lord E. C. Gordon-Lennox (21 July 1916)
Brigadier-General C. B. Norton (15 April 1918)

Second World War 

At the start of the war this formation was made up of regular army battalions based in the Middle East garrisons, nominally part of the 8th Infantry Division. It was present at the Battle of Crete, holding Heraklion airfield and causing many casualties among the German Parachute troops. Evacuated to North Africa where it became part of the 70th Infantry Division in the break out from Tobruk. The 70th Infantry Division was transferred to India and then Burma. Here the division, including the 14th Infantry Brigade, was split up and reformed as Chindits,  fighting in the Second Chindit Expedition of 1944 (codenamed Operation Thursday). The brigade suffered 489 casualties during the Chindit operation. On 1 November 1944 the brigade was redesignated as the 14th British Airlanding Brigade.

Order of battle
The following infantry battalions were assigned to the 14th Infantry Brigade for various periods in the Second World War.
2nd Battalion, Queen's Royal Regiment (West Surrey)
1st Battalion, Argyll and Sutherland Highlanders
2nd Battalion, Rifle Brigade (Prince Consort's Own)
1st Battalion, Welch Regiment
1st Battalion, Bedfordshire and Hertfordshire Regiment
2nd Battalion, York and Lancaster Regiment
2nd Battalion, King's Own Royal Regiment (Lancaster)
1st Battalion, South Staffordshire Regiment
2nd Battalion, Black Watch (Royal Highland Regiment)
2/4th Australian Infantry Battalion
2nd Battalion, Leicestershire Regiment
7th Battalion, Leicestershire Regiment

Commanders
Commanders included:
 Maj.-Gen. J. F. C. Fuller (? – 14 December 1930)
 Maj.-Gen. H. J. Huddleston (14 December 1930 – 1 July 1933)
 Brig. H. C. Maitland-Makgill-Crichton (11 July 1933 – 29 June 1937)
 Brig. H. C. Harrison (29 June 1937 – 27 January 1939)
 Brig. A. R. Godwin-Austen (31 December 1938 – 23 August 1939)
 Brig. G. Dawes (3 September 1939 – 26 July 1940)
 Brig. O. H. Tidbury (30 October 1940 – 27 April 1941)
 Brig. B. H. Chappel (27 April 1941 – 2 May 1942)
 Brig. A. Gilroy (2 May 1942 – 6 November 1943)
 Brig. Thomas Brodie (6 November 1943 – 31 October 1944)

See also 
 British Divisions in World War II
 British Army Order of Battle - September 1939
 6th Infantry Division
 Siege of Tobruk
Bigadier-General C.Compton, C.C., C.M.G. 28 June 1915 -

References

Further reading
 
 

014
Military units and formations established in 1914
Military units and formations disestablished in 1944
1914 establishments in the United Kingdom
Infantry brigades of the British Army in World War I
Infantry brigades of the British Army in World War II
Military units and formations in Burma in World War II